Daniel Krenželok (born 29 July 1997) is a Czech ice hockey defenceman currently playing for HC Vítkovice Ridera of the Czech Extraliga.

References

External links
 

1997 births
Living people
People from Karviná District
HC Vítkovice players
Czech ice hockey defencemen
Victoriaville Tigres players
Val-d'Or Foreurs players
Sportspeople from the Moravian-Silesian Region
Czech expatriate ice hockey players in Canada